Tong Daochi (born October 1967) is a former Chinese politician who served as Communist Party Secretary of Sanya between November 2018 and October 2020. He was a member of the Standing Committee of the CPC Hainan Provincial Committee. He was investigated by China's top anti-graft agency in November 2020.

Biography
Tong was born in Pingjiang County, Hunan in October 1967. After resuming the college entrance examination, he graduated from Peking University and Renmin University of China. After that, he continued his study at Carleton University in Canada as a postgraduate student. After university, he worked at RAND Corporation in Santa Monica, California, United States. In 1994 he worked at the World Bank in Washington, D.C.

Tong returned in China in late 2010 and that same year he became an official in the Planning and Development Department of China Securities Regulatory Commission. He worked there for 8 years. Then he was appointed Assistant Minister of Commerce.

In November 2016 he was transferred to central China's Hubei province and was named vice-governor in the following month. In November 2018 he was transferred again to south China's Hainan province and appointed Communist Party Secretary of Sanya, replacing Yan Zhaojun.

Investigation
On November 1, 2020, he has been placed under investigation for serious violations of laws and regulations by the Central Commission for Discipline Inspection (CCDI), the party's internal disciplinary body, and the National Supervisory Commission, the highest anti-corruption agency of China.

On April 30, 2021, he was expelled from the Communist Party of China (CPC) and removed from public office. On June 4, he was arrested for suspected bribe taking. On September 30, he was indicted on suspicion of accepting bribes.

On January 13, 2022, prosecutors accused Tong of using his different positions as a senior securities regulator and Sanya government official between 2004 and 2020 to offer business favors and promotion opportunities. In return, he accepted money and property worth over 274 million yuan ($43 million).

On June 2, he was sentenced to death for bribery and insider trading with a two-year reprieve.

References

External links 
 Biography of Tong Daochi 

1967 births
Politicians from Yueyang
Living people
Peking University alumni
Renmin University of China alumni
Carleton University alumni
People's Republic of China politicians from Hunan
Chinese Communist Party politicians from Hunan